Crough Seamount (named after the geologist Thomas Crough) is a seamount in the Pacific Ocean, within the exclusive economic zone of Pitcairn. This seamount has a flat top and probably formed an island in the past. It is about 7-8 million years old, although a large earthquake recorded at its position in 1955 may indicate a recent eruption.

The seamount appears to be part of a long geological lineament with the neighbouring Henderson and Ducie islands, as well as the southern Tuamotus and Line Islands. Such a lineament may have been generated by a hotspot; the nearby Easter hotspot is a candidate hotspot.

Geology and geomorphology

Regional 

The region lies between and around the islands of Pitcairn and Easter Island.

There is a topographic swell that connects the two islands and continues eastward towards Sala y Gomez. The origin of this swell and the various volcanoes and seamounts associated with it has been variously explained as either being due to a mantle plume which forms volcanoes that are then carried away through plate motion or by a "hot line" where a number of simultaneously active volcanic centres develop. This geological lineament may extend all the way to Tonga.

Crough seamount was probably formed by the Easter hotspot that also generated Easter Island albeit with the participation of a nearby fracture zone that modified the trend of the hotspot path. In this case the Easter Island-Sala y Gomez ridge and the Crough Seamount would be conjugate volcanic ridges paired across the East Pacific Rise. although it is possible that two separate hotspots were active on the eastern and western side of the East Pacific Rise. Another theory postulates that Crough was formed by its own hotspot, the Crough hotspot.

Even farther west the hotspot track may include Oeno, Minerve Reef, Marutea, Acton, Rangiroa and the Line Islands, although a continuation through the Line Islands is problematic if it is assumed that the Easter hotspot generated this track but more plausible if Crough seamount is supposed to be its own hotspot. East of Crough, a series of even younger volcanic ridges continues until the East Pacific Rise where the hotspot may be located. The Crough hotspot may be a conjugate of the Easter hotspot.

Local 

It has a flat top and the presence of coral sands indicates that Crough once emerged above sea level before subsiding to its present depth, having formerly hosted corals and pteropods. Wave erosion that took place when Crough emerged above sea level truncated the seamount, turning it into a flat guyot.

A second seamount lies nearby and partly overlaps with Crough, it is named Thomas Seamount in honour of a geophysicist.

Composition 

Dredging has yielded both vesicular and porphyritic basalt. Phenocrysts identified include clinopyroxene, olivine and plagioclase. Carbonates and hyaloclastites have also been found, and some samples were covered with manganese crusts and palagonite. Hydrothermal iron crusts have also been found.

Eruption history 

Argon-argon dating has yielded ages of 8.4 to 7.6 million years ago for samples dredged from Crough, while other geological indicators suggest an age of between 7 and 10 million years ago. Other estimates of its age are 4-3 million years.

In 1955, a strong earthquake was recorded on the northern flank of Crough Seamount; the characteristics of the earthquake resemble these of volcanic processes and it is thus possible that Crough Seamount is still active. Such activity may constitute a post-shield stage of volcanism. The earthquake has also been interpreted as a normal fault earthquake which sometimes occur in young oceanic crust, but the 1955 Crough event was considerably stronger than other earthquakes of this type.

References

Sources 

 
 
 
 
 
 
 
 
 

Seamounts of the Pacific Ocean
Miocene volcanoes
Pitcairn Islands